Satellite Shankar is a 2019 Indian Hindi-language action drama film written and directed by Irfan Kamal. The film starring Sooraj Pancholi and Megha Akash is produced by Cine 1 Studios and SCIPL. The film based on the life of Indian soldiers, tells a story of the adventures of Indian soldier (played by Pancholi). The principal photography began on 6 September 2018, and was shot across ten states in India.

The film was released on 8 November 2019.

Plot
Indian Army soldier Shankar gets injured in cross firing at the border. Senior Officer suggests him to take 8 days rest after consultation with doctors. Shankar requests for leave instead of rest, officers agree and tell him to report to duty on the morning of 8th day. While travelling, he helps citizens and ends up missing his train. Online news reporter covers his story without acknowledging him. The story later revolves around how he reaches his home and then back to duty in a short span of time.

Cast 
 Sooraj Pancholi as Shankar
 Megha Akash as Pramila
 Upendra Limaye as Inspector
 Anil K Reji as Sridhar
 Palomi Ghosh 
Pardeep Cheema as Subedar Jeetu Singh
 Raj Arjun
 Sameer Deshpande as Nasir Hussain
 Chhaya Kadam
 Sohaila Kapur
 Sanjay Gurbaxani
 Yogesh Bhardwaj
 Geetika Mehandru
 Asif Basra as Cab Driver outside Railway Station
 Lijo Srambikal as Driver at accident location

Production 
The film marks the return of Sooraj Pancholi who essays the role of an army officer after 3 years' hiatus as he previously starred in his debut 2015 action film Hero. The filming began on 3 September 2018 in Kashmir and most portions of the film were shot in North India in a 60-day schedule. The South Indian actress Megha Akash was cast as the female lead opposite Sooraj Pancholi, which marks her debut in Bollywood industry. The film was shot across the 10 states of India.

Release 
The film was theatrically released on 8 November 2019.

The filmmakers in February 2019 confirmed that the film will not have its theatrical release in Pakistan following the 2019 Pulwama attack on the Central Reserve Police Force in Jammu and Kashmir, which happened on 14 February 2019 resulting in the death of 40 CRPF personnel.

Soundtrack 

This music of the film is composed by Mithoon, Rochak Kohli, Tanishk Bagchi and Sandeep Shirodkar while lyrics are written by Mithoon, Kumaar and Manoj Muntashir.

Reception
Filmfare gave 3 stars out of 5 and said, "Satellite Shankar meanders off course a wee bit, is melodramatic and OTT at times but its heart certainly beats for Indian armed forces alright."

Box office 
Satellite Shankars opening-day domestic collection was 10 lacs. On the second day, the film collected 12 lacs. On the third day, the film collected 10 lacs, taking the total opening-weekend collection to 32 lacs.
The lifetime collection of film was 05.4 million.

References

External links 

 
 

2019 action drama films
2010s Hindi-language films
2019 films
Indian action drama films
Films scored by Sajid–Wajid
Films scored by Mithoon
Films scored by Tanishk Bagchi
T-Series (company) films
Films about armies
Indian Army in films